Dullaert may refer to:

People
 Heiman Dullaert (1636–1684), Dutch Golden Age painter and poet
 Jan Dullaert (c.1480–1513), Flemish philosopher and logician

Places
 Old name for the Braakman